Ría Lagartos Biosphere Reserve (established 2004) is a UNESCO Biosphere Reserve in the state of Yucatán, Mexico. The reserve is located at the eastern end of the coastal strip of the Yucatán Peninsula, with the Gulf of Mexico at its northern limit. The area encompasses coastal areas of the Gulf of Mexico and includes important wetlands designated under the Ramsar Wetlands Convention. The site presents a rich diversity of landscapes and ecosystems, such as mangroves, small estuaries, medium semi-evergreen forest, low deciduous forest, coastal dune vegetation, coastal lagoons, marshes (petenes) and savanna represented by tular vegetation, grasslands and reed beds that are the main nesting sites for marshland and sea birds.

Ecology
Ría Lagartos extends throughout a large wetland area which is a good example of a community characteristic for a coastal tropical savanna climate. The area is considered a globally unique wetland due to its high biological productivity, which in turn is due to conditions of marine to hypersalinity in a karst environment. Given its geographic position, the peninsula keeps a floristic relation with the neighboring regions of Central America, the river basin of the Caribbean Sea and southeastern Mexico.

Flora and fauna
The wetlands is home to at least 2,477 species and 98 varieties of vascular plants. At least 554 vertebrate species can be seen in the reserve, amongst them 142 endemics. Some of the more common animal species include:

American crocodile
American flamingo
American pygmy kingfisher
American white pelican
bare-throated tiger heron
black ctenosaur
black skimmer
black vulture
black-bellied plover
black-bellied whistling-duck
black-necked stilt
brown basilisk
brown pelican
common black hawk
double-crested cormorant
golden-fronted woodpecker
great blue heron
great kiskadee
great-tailed grackle
green heron
green sea turtle
hawksbill sea turtle
hooded oriole
killdeer
laughing falcon
laughing gull
little blue heron
magnificent frigatebird
mangrove swallow
morelet's crocodile
muscovy duck
neotropic cormorant
northern cardinal
northern jacana
northern mockingbird
northern waterthrush
olive-throated parakeet
osprey
peregrine falcon
raccoon
red-winged blackbird
royal tern
snowy egret
tricolored heron
tropical kingbird
turquoise-browed motmot
vermilion flycatcher
wood stork
Yucatan jay
Yucatan woodpecker

Human impact
In the last years, the vegetation has been strongly affected by human activities, particularly by agriculture and livestock raising, practices that imply the destruction of vast surfaces of vegetation. Also, it has been affected by natural catastrophes like the hurricanes that regularly hit this region and the subsequent forest fires. The communities located in the biosphere reserve are San Felipe, Río Lagartos, Las Coloradas and El Cuyo. 6,916 permanent residents live in the buffer zone. The use of natural resources dates back to the pre-Hispanic period. The main productive activities today include fishing, agriculture, livestock rearing, salt extraction, tourism, aquaculture and urban development. The ecotourism activity is stimulated to promote the participation of local inhabitants in the conservation of the natural, archaeological, historical and cultural heritage of the biosphere reserve, providing appropriate economic and social benefits.

From a cultural point of view, the territory includes an important Mayan zone dating back to the period of 300 to 50 years BC. The territory belonged to the chieftainship of Ecab in the pre-Hispanic period. Eighteen of the 1,585 identified archaeological sites in Yucatán are located in this area. In addition, the reserve counts three of the eight concheros (banks of marine shells) that exist in the state.

Sources

References

External links
Programa de Conservación y Manejo Reserva de la Biosfera Ría Lagartos(Spanish), 2007

Biosphere reserves of Mexico
Ramsar sites in Mexico
Protected areas of Yucatán
Wetlands of Mexico
Important Bird Areas of Mexico